The 1966 Yugoslav First Basketball League season was the 22nd season of the Yugoslav First Basketball League.

Classification 

The winning roster of Olimpija:
  Ivo Daneu
  Emil Logar
  
  Vital Eiselt
  Matija Dermastija
  Miha Lokar
  Darko Hočevar
  Jure Božič
  Andrej Osterc
  Dušan Verbič
  Igor Jelnikar
  
  Andrej Brenk

Coach:  Boris Kristančič

Qualification in 1966–67 season European competitions 

FIBA European Champions Cup
 Olimpija (champions)

FIBA Cup Winners' Cup
 Partizan (2nd)

References

Yugoslav First Basketball League seasons